The county of Suffolk, England is divided into 7 parliamentary constituencies
– 1 borough constituency and 6 county constituencies.

Constituencies

2010 boundary changes 
In the Fifth Review the Boundary Commission for England recommended that Suffolk retained its current constituencies, with changes only to reflect revisions to local authority ward boundaries and to reduce the electoral disparity between constituencies. The largest of these changes resulted in the effective transfer of one Borough of Ipswich ward from Central Suffolk and North Ipswich to the constituency of Ipswich.

Proposed boundary changes 
See 2023 Periodic Review of Westminster constituencies for further details.

Following the abandonment of the Sixth Periodic Review (the 2018 review), the Boundary Commission for England formally launched the 2023 Review on 5 January 2021. Initial proposals were published on 8 June 2021 and, following two periods of public consultation, revised proposals were published on 8 November 2022. Final proposals will be published by 1 July 2023.

The commission has proposed that Suffolk be combined with Norfolk as a sub-region of the Eastern Region, with the creation of the cross-county boundary constituency of Waveney Valley. The current seat of Waveney would revert to its former name of Lowestoft. The following constituencies are proposed:

Containing electoral wards from Babergh

 South Suffolk

Containing electoral wards from East Suffolk

 Central Suffolk and North Ipswich (part)
 Lowestoft
 Suffolk Coastal
 Waveney Valley (parts also in Mid Suffolk and South Norfolk)

Containing electoral wards from Ipswich

 Central Suffolk and North Ipswich (part)

 Ipswich

Containing electoral wards from Mid Suffolk

 Bury St Edmunds (part)

 Central Suffolk and North Ipswich (part)
 Waveney Valley (parts also in East Suffolk and South Norfolk)

Containing electoral wards from West Suffolk

 Bury St Edmunds (part)
 West Suffolk

Results history 
Primary data source: House of Commons research briefing - General election results from 1918 to 2019

2019 
The number of votes cast for each political party who fielded candidates in constituencies comprising Suffolk in the 2019 general election were as follows:

Percentage votes 

1Includes National Liberal Party from 1931 - 1966

21918-1979 - Liberal; 1983 & 1987 - SDP-Liberal Alliance

* Included in Other

Seats 

1Includes National Liberal Party up to 1966

21950-1979 - Liberal; 1983 & 1987 - SDP-Liberal Alliance

Maps

Timeline

Historical representation by party
A cell marked → (with a different colour background to the preceding cell) indicates that the previous MP continued to sit under a new party name.

1885 to 1918

1918 to 1950

1950 to 1983

1983 to present

See also
List of parliamentary constituencies in the East of England (region)
History of parliamentary constituencies and boundaries in Suffolk

Notes

References

Suffolk
 
Suffolk
Parliamentary constituencies